Air Liquide is the self-titled first full-length studio album by German electronic artists Air Liquide.  It was released in 1993.

Track listing
 "Things Happen" – 2:14
 "Tanz Der Lemminge II" – 9:34
 "Liquid Air (The Bionaut Remix)" – 5:34
 "Revelation" – 3:50
 "Psy 9" – 11:39
 "Argon" – 2:36
 "Sun Progress" – 9:00
 "Unraveling My Curls" – 7:43
 "Liquid Men With Liquid Hearts" – 5:55
 "Liquid Air (Original Version)" – 10:54
 "Gelb (Remix)" – 3:30

1993 albums
Air Liquide (band) albums